Roman Vladimirovich Krivulkin (born 18 February 1996) is a Belarusian professional footballer.

Career
Born in a small village in Vitebsk Oblast, Belarus, he moved to Saint Petersburg, Russia at the age of 6. After studying for a few years in FC Zenit Academy, he signed with CSKA Moscow in 2015. Unable to push his way to the senior team, he returned to Belarus in 2017 and signed with Krumkachy Minsk.

References

External links
 
 

1996 births
Living people
Belarusian footballers
Association football defenders
Belarusian expatriate footballers
Expatriate footballers in Russia
PFC CSKA Moscow players
FC Krumkachy Minsk players
FC Torpedo Minsk players
FC Slutsk players
FC Leningradets Leningrad Oblast players